Paramiacis ("near Miacis") is an extinct genus of placental mammals from clade Carnivoraformes, that lived in Europe from middle to late Eocene. Species P. exilis and P. teilhardi were long believed to be a same species (P. exilis), with differences that were only represented as an example of sexual dimorphism.

Phylogeny
The phylogenetic relationships of genus Paramiacis are shown in the following cladogram:

See also
 Mammal classification
 Carnivoraformes
 Miacidae

References

†
Eocene mammals of Europe
Miacids
Prehistoric placental genera